Kim Chul-won (born January 22, 1984) is a South Korean international rugby union player from Seoul. He plays as a scrum-half. He plays for  Kintetsu Liners in Japan's Top League.

Kim was drafted into the Japan squad for Rugby World Cup 2007, playing two games, as a substitute, with Wales, in the 72-18 loss, and in the 12-12 drew with Canada. He is absent from his National Team since then.

External links

1984 births
Living people
Japan international rugby union players
Hanazono Kintetsu Liners players
Rugby union scrum-halves
South Korean expatriate sportspeople in Japan
South Korean rugby union players